Wrike, Inc. is an American project management application service provider based in San Jose, California.  Wrike also has offices in Dallas, Tallinn, Nicosia, Dublin, Tokyo, Melbourne and Prague.

History

Wrike was founded in 2006 by Andrew Filev. Filev initially self-funded the company before later obtaining investor funding. Wrike released the beta version of its software (also called Wrike) in December 2006. The company then launched a new "Enterprise" platform in December 2013.

In June 2015, Wrike announced the opening of an office in Dublin, Ireland and in 2016, Wrike launched a datacenter there to host data in compliance with local privacy regulations. In July 2016, Wrike announced the launch of Wrike for Marketers. That same year, Wrike's headquarters moved from Mountain View to San Jose, California. 

In January 2021, Citrix Systems announced its intention to acquire Wrike for $2.25 billion. The acquisition closed in March 2021.

Investments 
Wrike received $1 million in Angel funding in 2012 from TMT Investments. In October, 2013, Wrike secured $10 million in investment funding from Bain Capital. In May 2015, the company secured $15 million in a new round of funding. Investors included Scale Venture Partners, DCM Ventures, and Bain Capital. At that time, Wrike had 8,000 customers, 200 employees, and 30,000 new users each month.

On November 29, 2018, Wrike signed a definitive agreement to receive a majority investment by Vista Equity Partners (“Vista”), a firm focused on software, data and technology-enabled businesses.

Software
The Wrike project management software is a Software-as-a-Service (SaaS) product that enables its users to manage and track projects, deadlines, schedules, and other workflow processes. It also allows users to collaborate with one another. The application is available in English, French, Spanish, German, Portuguese, Italian, Japanese and Russian. The software streamlines workflow and allows companies to focus on core tasks. As of 2022, it was used by over 20,000 companies

Features 
Wrike is designed around a minimalist multi-pane UI and consists of features in two categories: project management, and team collaboration. Project Management features are those which help teams track dates and dependencies associated with projects, manage assignments and resources, and track time. These include an interactive Gantt chart, a workload view, and a sortable table that can be customized to store project data.

Collaboration features are those designed to aid in conversations, asset creation, and decision-making by teams. These include Wrike's Live co-editor, discussion threads on tasks, and tools for attaching documents, editing them, and tracking their changes. Wrike uses an "inbox" feature and browser notifications to alert users of updates from their colleagues and dashboards for quick overviews of pending tasks. These updates are also available in Wrike's mobile apps on iOS and Android. Wrike has an optional feature set called "Wrike for Marketers" which has several tools for managing marketing workflows. 

In May 2012, Wrike announced the launch of a freemium version of its software for teams of up to 5 users. That year also saw the integration of a live text coeditor into its workspace to unify collaboration and task management. In late 2013 Wrike released a new feature set called Wrike Enterprise which included advanced analytics and other tools targeted at large business customers. Since then it has released several major updates to Wrike Enterprise, including a customizable spreadsheet called "Dynamic Platform" in late 2014 and custom workflows for teams in 2015. In July 2016,  Wrike was updated with a set of add-on features under the name "Wrike for Marketers," which includes integrations with Adobe Photoshop, a tool for submitting requests, and proofing and approval tools for creative assets like videos and images.

Wrike is available as native Android and iOS apps.  Mobile apps include an interactive Gantt chart that syncs across devices. The apps are available offline, and sync when connection is restored.

Integrations 
Wrike integrates with a number of other enterprise systems. These include:

 Adobe
 Box.com
 Google Drive
 Microsoft Teams
 DropBox
 Microsoft Word
 Microsoft Office 365 and Azure AD
 Gmail
 Salesforce.com

It also has an API so that developers can build their own integrations.

Company recognition and awards
 2015 - Listed in by Deloitte's 2015 Technology Fast 500TM Ranking
 2015 - Named one of the "Best Places to Work" by San Francisco Business Times/Silicon Valley Business Journal
 2016 - GetApp Rank Wrike as the Best Project Management Software
 2016 - Named Leader in Enterprise Collaborative Work Management by Forrester Wave

See also
 Comparison of project management software
 Comparison of time-tracking software
 List of collaborative software
 List of project management software

References

Software companies based in the San Francisco Bay Area
Companies based in San Jose, California
American companies established in 2006
Software companies established in 2006
Online companies of the United States
Software companies of the United States
Android (operating system) software
As a service
Business software
Collaborative software
Groupware
IOS software
Project management software
Web applications
2021 mergers and acquisitions
Citrix Systems